Mill Creek is a  long 3rd order tributary to Whitethorn Creek in Pittsylvania County, Virginia.

Course 
Mill Creek rises about 2 miles south of Whittles, Virginia and then flows generally east to join Whitethorn Creek about 1 mile east of Coles Hill.

Watershed 
Mill Creek drains  of area, receives about 45.6 in/year of precipitation, has a wetness index of 426.60, and is about 50% forested.

See also 
 List of Virginia Rivers

References 

Rivers of Virginia
Rivers of Pittsylvania County, Virginia
Tributaries of the Roanoke River